Freedom Highway is the second solo studio album of Folk/Americana musician and Carolina Chocolate Drops front woman Rhiannon Giddens. It was released via Nonesuch Records on February 24, 2017. Freedom Highway was nominated for Album of the Year at the 2017 Americana Music Honors & Awards. The title track "Freedom Highway" is a 1965 civil rights protest song written by Roebuck Staples and title track of The Staple Singers' album of the same name.

Track listing

Personnel

Eric Adcock – engineering, Hammond B3, Wurlitzer 
Patrick Bartley – tenor saxophone
Bhi Bhiman – electric guitar, background vocals (track 12)
David Bither – executive producer
Desiree Champagne – Rubboard
Rowan Corbett – percussion, harmony vocals
Jamie Dick – drums, percussion
Rhiannon Giddens – vocals, banjo, handclapping, production
Lalenja Harrington – harmony vocals
Jeri Heiden – design
Alphonso Horne – trumpet
Hubby Jenkins – banjo, mandolin
Robert C. Ludwig – mastering
Leyla McCalla – cello, harmony vocals
Malcolm Parson – cello
John Peets – photography
Amelia Powell – handclapping
Dirk Powell – electric bass, bells, engineer, fiddle, acoustic guitar, electric guitar, mandolin, mixing, piano, producer, harmony vocals
Ina Powell – handclapping
Sophie Powell – handclapping
Jason Sypher – bass
Nolan Theis – horn engineer
Corey Wilcox – trombone

Charts

References

2017 albums
Nonesuch Records albums
Rhiannon Giddens albums